Abdullahi Yusuf Airport , formerly known as the Galkayo Airport, is an airport located in Galkayo, the capital of the north-central Mudug region of Somalia.

Overview
Like most of Galkayo, the Abdullahi Yusuf Airport is administered by the autonomous Puntland government. It has acted as a buffer zone between the divided city's two main divisions. Taxes collected by the airport authority are split equally between the Puntland and Galmudug administrations, facilitating relations between the two regional authorities.

On 25 March 2012, the facility was officially renamed in memory of the late Colonel Abdullahi Yusuf Ahmed, the former President of Somalia, who was born in Galkayo.

Airlines and destinations

Accidents and incidents

Non-aviation security incidents
On 7 April 2014 a Briton and a Frenchman working for the United Nations were shot dead by a man in a police uniform while they sat in their car at Galkayo airport. A U.N. mission spokesman said it was not clear who was behind the attack. U.N. Secretary-General Ban Ki-moon and the U.N. Security Council both strongly condemned the attack and called on Somali authorities to bring the perpetrators to justice. Then, on 2 October 2017 the airport's chief of security, Colonel Abdisalan Sanyare Owke and his bodyguard, were shot dead by a policeman. The assailant's motive was not immediately clear.

References

External links 
 Galkayo: A peaceful island in Somalia
 Galcaio Airport or Galkayo Airport or Gaalkacyo Airport (GLK)
 

Airports in Somalia
Galkayo